Suillus caerulescens is an edible species of bolete fungus in the family Suillaceae. It was first described scientifically by American mycologists Alexander H. Smith and Harry D. Thiers in 1964. It can be found growing with Douglas fir trees. Its stem bruises blue, which sometimes takes a few minutes.

The cap is yellowish to reddish brown, sometimes with streaks from its darker center. The flesh is yellowish, as are the pores. The stalk is yellowish to brown, darkening with age, 2–8 cm tall and 1–3 cm wide, and bruises bluish at the base; it sometimes has a faint ring.

While edible, it is considered of poor quality.

Suillus lakei is fairly similar.

See also
List of North American boletes

References

External links

caerulescens
Edible fungi
Fungi described in 1964
Fungi of North America
Taxa named by Harry Delbert Thiers
Taxa named by Alexander H. Smith